Detectives (German: Detektive) is a 1969 West German crime film directed by Rudolf Thome and starring Ulli Lommel, Marquard Bohm and Uschi Obermaier. It was shot at the Bavaria Studios in Munich and on location around the city. The film was shot during the middle of 1968, but was not given a general release until the following year.

Cast
 Ulli Lommel as Sebastian West
 Marquard Bohm as Andy Schubert
 Uschi Obermaier as Micky 
 Elke Haltaufderheide as Christa 
 Iris Berben as Annabella Quant
 Peter Moland as Busse
 Dieter Busch as Reiniger
 Florian Obermaier as Kind Florian
 Walter Rilla as Krüger
 Peter Berling as Möbelpacker 
 Eberhard Maier as 	Möbelpacker
 Rosl Mayr as Wirtin
 Max Zihlmann as Gast im Café

References

Bibliography
 Bock, Hans-Michael & Bergfelder, Tim. The Concise Cinegraph: Encyclopaedia of German Cinema. Berghahn Books, 2009.

External links

1969 films
1969 crime films
German crime films
West German films
1960s German-language films
Films directed by Rudolf Thome
Films shot at Bavaria Studios
Films shot in Munich
1960s German films